The Phunoi (Lao:  ຜູ້ນ້ອຍ; also spelled Phu Noi or Phounoi, and called Côông, Cống, or formerly Khong in Vietnam) are a tribal people of Laos, Northern Thailand, and Vietnam. They are related to the Mpi people and the Bisu people.

Etymology 
"Phunoi" means "little man" in various Tai languages and is not this ethnic group's original name, which is probably "Khong".

Distribution 
There are approximately 35,600 Phunoi in Laos and 1,300 in Vietnam (the 1960 census indicated that there were approximately 6,500 at that time). In Laos, many Phunoi live in Phongsali Province (around the town of Phongsali), Louang Namtha Province, and Houaphanh Province. Some also live in Luang Phrabang Province and Vientiane Province, the remnant of those serving in the Royal Lao Armed Forces.

Culture 
They speak Phunoi, a Tibeto-Burman language that is classified as one of the Loloish languages. The community is divided into several clans, each with its own taboos and customs for ancestor worship. Their primary occupation is slash-and-burn agriculture. They also produce a variety of handicrafts, most notably rattan baskets and mats.

References

Further reading
 The Akha and Phu Noi Minorities of Laos in the 1920s. Henri Roux. 2011. White Lotus Press.

External links
 Vietnam National Administration of Tourism 

Ethnic groups in Laos
Ethnic groups in Vietnam